Anurag Acharya is an Indian-American engineer known for co-founding Google Scholar, of which he has been described as the "key inventor". As of 2023, Acharya held the title of Distinguished Engineer at Google. He and his Google colleague Alex Verstak co-founded Google Scholar in 2004. Acharya got the idea for the project years earlier when he was an undergraduate at the Indian Institute of Technology Kharagpur and had difficulty quickly accessing scholarly literature. He received a Distinguished Alumnus Award from the Indian Institute of Technology Kharagpur in 2016.

References

External links

21st-century Indian engineers
Google people
IIT Kharagpur alumni
Carnegie Mellon University alumni
20th-century Indian engineers
Indian software engineers
Living people
Year of birth missing (living people)